Om Prakash is an Indian cinematographer, primarily working in Tamil cinema, though he has also worked in Hindi, Telugu and Malayalam films. He has years of experience in feature Films, corporate films, documentaries, music videos and over 500 advertising films.

In a career spanning over fifteen years, his work has been hugely influential in the Tamil, Malayalam, Kannada and Telugu film industries.
The technical brilliance that Om Prakash showcased in Kalavani, Naanayam, Anegan, Maari, and Neethaane En Ponvasantham proved the tremendous talent that he possesses and helped establish himself as a promising cinematographer in the Indian film industry.

Filmography

References

External links
 

Cinematographers from Tamil Nadu
Living people
People from Coimbatore
Tamil film cinematographers
Year of birth missing (living people)